Bibran-Modlau (Bibran, Bibra und Modlau, Bibra-Modlau) was a Silesian noble family which was raised to Reichsfreiherr (Imperial barons) 1624.

One source (Origines familiae Bibranorum in Francia orientali utraque Silesia et Lusatia ...) reports that the family descends from a Sigmund von Bibra (Franconian Bibra family) who traveled to Silesia in the 11th century, however the different coat of arms casts doubt on the connection.  The description with the published (c. 1860) print of Schloss Modlau describes the Bibran family as having split off from the Franconia Bibras five hundred years ago.

The family appears for the first time with Sigmund von Bibra, who apparently followed Agnes von Babenberg, granddaughter of Emperor Henry IV and bride Duke Władysław II had come to Silesia from Franconia. The family was divided into the Modlau line in the Bunzlau district , Profen in the Jauer district and Kittlitz-Treben-Woitsdorf in the Bunzlau district and Goldberg-Haynau. By 1480 Modlau and Profen were already in possession of the family. At the end of the family, it was centered at Reisicht and Modlau, in present-day Poland.  Prominent members of the family were: Friedrich Heinrich von Bibran-Modlau, Abraham von Bibran Kittlitztreben und Woitsdorf, and Sigismund Heinrich von Bibran-Modlau († 1693) who was one of the largest land owner in Silesia.

Modlau Line 

 Nikolaus von Bibran zu Modlau († after 1510); ⚭ NN von Krommenau
 George von Bibran zu Modlau, Wolfshayn, Kosel, Thomaswalde; ⚭ NN von Hock und Thomaswalde
 Nikolaus von Bibran auf Modlau, Elder of the Principality of Jauer (1573–1600); ⚭ Eva von Schkopp
 Heinrich Freiherr von Bibran, Lord of Modlau, imperial. councilor, chamberlain and provincial governor  (1597–1642); ⚭ Helena von Stosch zu Klein-Kotzen und Kreidelwitz
 Eva Eleonora von Bibran; 1.⚭ Sigsmund Freiherr von Klein-Lignitz († 1664); 2.⚭ Johann Heinrich Freiherr von Malzhan
 Nikolaus Alexander Freiherr von Bibran und Modlau, (1626–1680); 1.⚭ Maria Elisabeth von Kühnheim auf Nippern und Guckerwitz; 2.⚭ Anna Hedwig von Tschammer auf Dase; 3.⚭ Ursula Helena von Pitzelwitz auf Machwitz
 Heinrich Alexander Freiherr von Bibran (1656–1695); ⚭ Susanna Elisabeth Freiin von Schleepusch auf Groß-Polwitz und Heidenberg
 Friedrich Heinrich Freiherr von Bibran und Modlau; 1.⚭ Johanna Margaretha von Sack auf Lubichen († 1710); 2.⚭ Maria Elisabeth Freiin von Schweinitz auf Seifersdorf († 1721); 3.⚭ Charlotta Helena Freiin von Beeß und Cölln
 Friedrich Wilhelm Freiherr von Bibran (1674–1705); ⚭ Ursula Catharina Freiin von Stosch auf Gräditz
 Johann Georg Freiherr von Bibran auf Reisicht (1628–1682)
 Friedrich Freiherr von Bibran auf Modlau († 1708)
 Hiob Heinrich Freiherr von Bibran auf Giesmannsdorf (1635–1689)
 Sigismund Heinrich Freiherr von Bibran und Modlau (1640–1693); ⚭ Maria Catharina von Czettritz auf Waldenburg († 1718)
 Sigismund Freiherr von Bibran und Modlau († 1696)
 Alexandrina Rosina Freiin von Bibran und Modlau; ⚭ Anselm Graf von Promnitz und Pforten
 Benjamin Freiherr von Bibran und Modlau, chamerlain of the English king (* 1692); ⚭ NN Freiin von Löwendal und Elsterwerda
 Helena Freiin von Bibran und Modlau († after 1714); ⚭ Friedrich Wilhelm von Kannenberg
 Henrietta Catharina Freiin von Bibran und Modlau († after 1701); ⚭ Christoph Friedrich Reichsgraf von Stolberg
 Barbara von Bibran; ⚭ Christoph von Haugwitz zu Töppendorf
 Eva von Bibran; ⚭ Sigismund von Nostitz zu Lasan
 Anna Maria von Bibran; ⚭ Conrad von Hohnberg zu Rohnstock und Leuthen
 Friedrich von Bibran und Modlau auf Reisicht, Tammendorf, Wittgendorf, Tschirbsdorf und Jakobsdorf, Council of the Principality of  Liegnitz; ⚭ NN von Hohberg
 Anna Helena von Bibran († 1642); ⚭ Joachim von Niemitz und Jungferndorf
 Seifried von Bibran zu Wolfshayn
 Kaspar von Bibran zu Kosel und Altenoelse
 Christoph von Bibran zu Thomaswalde
 Heinrich von Bibran zu Heinzebortschen
 Elisabeth von Bibran († 1573); ⚭ Peter von Faust zu Schönfeld

Wolfshayn Line 

 Seyfried von Bibran († after 1530); ⚭ NN von Zedlitz und Parchwitz
 Seyfried von Bibran († after 1580); ⚭ NN
 Martin von Bibran auf Wolfshayn und Martinswalde
 Seyfried von Bibran auf Wolfshayn und Martinswalde
 Elisabeth von Bibran († after 1580); ⚭ Wenzel von Zedlitz, Governor (Landeshauptmann)

Kosel Line 

 Kaspar von Bibran zu Kosel und Altenoelse († about 1524); ⚭ NN
 George von Bibran zu Kosel († after 1540); ⚭ NN
 Kaspar von Bibran zu Kosel und Alten-Oelse († before 1588); ⚭ Anna von Kottwitz
 Valentin von Bibran († 1591); ⚭ Salome von Loß und Hermsdorf
 Salome von Bibran; 1.⚭ Sigismund von Loß in Wilcke; 2.⚭ Christoph von Niebelschütz in Retka
 Valentin von Bibran auf Oelse, Obetreben, Wenigtreben und Beutendorf († after 1626)
 Hans von Bibran auf Kosel und Buchwald († after 1626)

Heinzebortschen Line 

 Heinrich von Bibran auf Heinzebortschen; ⚭ NN
 Heinrich von Bibran; ⚭ Barbara von Bortwitz auf Neudorf
 Wolf George von Bibran (1618–1679); ⚭ NN

Prosen Line 

 Wolf von Bibran zu Prosen; ⚭ NN von Zedlitz und Neukirch
 Anton von Bibran († after 1540); ⚭ NN von Blanckenstein
 Anton von Bibran (1573–1596); ⚭ NN von Kalckreut und Lipsche
 Wolfgang von Bibran auf Prosen, studied in Leipzig 1581

Kittlitztreben Line 

 Christoph von Bibran zu Kittlitztreben († after 1540); ⚭ Anna von Zedlitz und Warte
 Johannes von Bibran zu Kittlitztreben, Lichtenwaldau und Linden († after 1566); ⚭ Eva von Schellendorf auf Polsdorf
 Abraham von Bibran und Kittlitztreben auf Woitsdorf, provincial elder and assessor of land law for the principalities of Schweidnitz-Jauer (1575–1625); ⚭ Kunigunde von Gersdorf auf Seichau
 Adam von Bibran zu Damsdorf und Prosen; ⚭ NN von Tschirnhaus auf Häselicht

Closely related families with derived names and coat of arms

Block von Bibran und Modlau, Kölichen gen. Freiherren von Bibra(n) u. Modlau, Schönberg von Bibra(n) und Modlau
David Heinrich von Bibran-Modlau was the apparent last male member of the family in Silesia.  When he died in 1828, he had three daughters.  His three sons-in-law (von Kölichen, von Block and von Schönberg) incorporated the Bibran-Modlau into their names and coat of arms.

von Senden-Bibran
The son-in-law Ernst Heinrich von Kölichen, who had incorporated the Bibran-Modlau name and coat of arms died (1832) with a daughter, Agnes, but no sons.  Ernst's son-in-law, Ludwig von Senden again incorporated (c. 1836) the Bibran name into his own becoming “von Senden-Bibran” as in Gustav von Senden-Bibran.

Bibran related castles

Footnotes

References
 Page 54, Gotha. genealog. Taschenbuch der Freiherrlichen Häuser, 18. Jg. 1868
WILHELM FRHR. VON BIBRA, Beiträge zur Familien Geschichte der Reichsfreiherrn von Bibra, Ernster Band (vol. 1), 1880;   Universitäts- und Landesbibliothek Düsseldorf pages 28–29.

External links 
 https://web.archive.org/web/20160303174300/http://www.schlossarchiv.de/herren/b/BI/Bibran.htm Bibran entry on Archiv der deutschen Rittergüter und Feudalherrschaften Waybackmachine 2016
 https://web.archive.org/web/20070612064104/http://www.zlb.de/digitalesammlungen/SammlungDuncker/07/374%20Reisicht.pdf Picture and History of Schloss Reisicht (German) F. Pazelt, Theodor Albert (1822-1867), Alexander Duncker (1813-1897)
 https://web.archive.org/web/20070612074729/http://www.zlb.de/digitalesammlungen/SammlungDuncker/06/317%20Moldau.pdf Picture and History of Schloss Moldau including relationship of Bibran (Silesia) family to Bibra (Franconian) (German) F. Pazelt, Theodor Albert (1822-1867), Alexander Duncker (1813-1897)
 

Bibran-Modlau, von
Bibran-Modlau, von
Bibran-Modlau, House of